The 174th Pennsylvania House of Representatives District is located in Philadelphia County and includes the following areas:

 Ward 56 [PART, Divisions 02, 05, 06, 10, 11, 12, 16, 17, 18, 19, 20, 21, 22, 23, 24, 25, 26, 27, 28, 29, 30, 31, 35, 36, 37, 38, 39 and 41]
 Ward 57 [PART, Divisions 01, 02, 03, 04, 05, 06, 07, 08, 09, 10, 11, 12, 15, 16, 17, 18, 19, 20, 21, 22, 23, 24, 25, 26, 27 and 28]
 Ward 58 [PART, Divisions 11 and 28]
 Ward 66 [PART, Divisions 19, 21, 25, 26, 27, 28 and 46]

Representatives

References

Government of Philadelphia
174